Edgar Mason Borden (May 1, 1888 – June 30, 1955) was an American film actor who started his career in vaudeville as an acrobat and then successfully turned to comedy. Throughout the 1920s, he toured in the Keith, Orpheum and Pantages vaudeville circuits, often billed as "the high hat comedian" and the "fun king." Borden appeared in nearly 160 films between 1922 and 1952 and was mostly seen in comedic bit parts. Borden appeared in numerous films with Laurel and Hardy.

Biography
He was born on May 1, 1888 in Waynesville, Ohio. His father was from Deer Lodge, Tennessee.

He appeared in nearly 160 films between 1922 and 1952 and was mostly seen in comedic bit parts and occasionally as the principal comic relief in films such as Jungle Bride. 
 
He died on June 30, 1955, aged 67, in Hollywood, California.

Selected filmography

 Hold Everything (1925)
 Battling Butler (1926)
 Gigolo (1926)
 One Chance in a Million (1927)
 The Show Girl (1927)
 The Dove (1927)
 Rough Romance (1930)
 The Rampant Age (1930)
 Transatlantic (1931)
 Monkey Business (1931)
 Breach of Promise (1932)
 Jungle Bride (1933)
 Hollywood on Parade No. A-8 (1933)
 Belle of the Nineties (1934)
 Babes In Toyland (1934)
 The Bohemian Girl (1936)
 Way Out West (1937)
 Saps at Sea (1940)
 A Chump at Oxford (1940)
 Secrets of a Model (1940)
 The Devil and Daniel Webster (1941) (uncredited)
 The Dolly Sisters (1945)
 On Dangerous Ground (1952)

References

External links

Eddie Borden at Laurel & Hardy From the Forties Forward

Vaudeville performers
Male actors from New York (state)
1888 births
1955 deaths
People from Waynesville, Ohio